The 2012 Presbyterian Blue Hose football team represented Presbyterian College in the 2012 NCAA Division I FCS football season. They were led by fourth-year head coach Harold Nichols and played their home games at Bailey Memorial Stadium. They are a member of the Big South Conference. They finished the season 2–9, 0–6 in Big South play to finish in last place.

Schedule

Source: Schedule

Game summaries

Brevard

at Georgia Tech

at Vanderbilt

Furman

at Davidson

at VMI

Liberty

at Charleston Southern

Stony Brook

Coastal Carolina

at Gardner-Webb

References

Presbyterian
Presbyterian Blue Hose football seasons
Presbyterian Blue Hose football